Sea Otter Rocks (Kamni Bobrovyye) are rock islets of the Commander Islands archipelago in the Bering Sea, Russia.

They are within Kamchatka Krai, in the Russian Far East.

See also
Islands of the Commander Islands
Islands of the Russian Far East

Islands of the Commander Islands
Islands of the Bering Sea
Islands of the Russian Far East
Islands of Kamchatka Krai